Koyalgudem is a village in Choutuppal mandal, Yadadri Bhuvanagiri district in Telangana, India. This village popular for its 100% cotton and silk handloom (Ikat) manufacturing and exports. This village is separated from Ellambavi, a new gram panchayath was formed in 2018.

Politics 
Bhuvanagiri as a Lok Sabha constituency came into existence in 2008 as per Delimitation Act of 2002.
Komatireddy Venkat Reddy is the present MP
Kusukuntla Prabhakar Reddy is the present MLA
Jella Venkatesham is the present MPTC

Nearest cities 
Hyderabad - 45 km
Pedda Amberpet ORR - 24 km
Nalgonda - 58 km
Suryapet - 94 km

Transport 
 Nearest Local Bus stop: Koyalagudem - 0 Km
 Nearest Bus station: Choutuppal - 5 Km
 Nearest Railway Division(All Trains): Secunderabad Code:SC - 51Km
 Nearest Airport: RGIA Hyderabad(Shamshabad) - 59Km

References

Villages in Yadadri Bhuvanagiri district